Brainchild is the only studio album by American group Society of Soul, composed of the production team Organized Noize, singer Esparonza Brown and poet Big Rube. It was released on LaFace Records in 1995. The album peaked at #93 on the Top R&B/Hip-Hop Albums chart in the United States.

JazzTimes called the album "shamefully ignored," and described it as an "aural trip through the soul of urban Atlanta."

Track listing
Credits adapted from liner notes.
"Genesis (Intro)"
"E.M.B.R.A.C.E."
"Changes" (featuring T-Boz)
"It Only Gets Better"
"Brainchild (Interlude)"
"Brainchild"
"Ghetto Fuh Life"
"Right Tonight"
"Judas (Interlude)"
"Pushin'"
"Migratention"
"Sonja Marie (Interlude)"
"Wind"
"Blac Mermaid" (featuring Cee-Lo Green and George Clinton)
"Peaches N' Erb"
"No Hard Feelings (Outro)"

Charts

Personnel

References

External links

1995 debut albums
LaFace Records albums
Dungeon Family albums
Albums produced by Organized Noize